Khlong Lan National Park (Thai อุทยานแห่งชาติคลองลาน) is a  national park in Thailand.

Description
Khlong Lan National Park is situated in the Dawna Mountain Range.

This park lies in Khlong Lan and Mueang Kamphaeng Phet districts of Kamphaeng Phet Province, the Lower north of Thailand and occupies 187,500 rai ~ .

The park is rugged and hilly along the Dawna Range, and is covered by fertile forest.
It's the origin of Khlong Khlung and Khlong Suan Mak, the tributaries of the Ping River. The famous places in the park are Khlong Lan and Khlong Nam Lai Waterfalls.

History
The park was declared a national park on December 25, 1985 as the 44th park of Thailand.

See also
 List of national parks in Thailand
 List of Protected Areas Regional Offices of Thailand

References

External links

National Park Division

Geography of Kamphaeng Phet province
National parks of Thailand
Tourist attractions in Kamphaeng Phet province
Protected areas established in 1985
1985 establishments in Thailand
Dawna Range